The 1998 ARFU Asian Rugby Championship was the 16th edition  of the tournament, and was played in Singapore. The 10 teams were divided in two division. Japan won the tournament.

Tournament

First division

Second Division

Pool 1

Pool 2

Finals 
First Place final

Third Place Final

°Fifth Place Final

Bibliography 
 Francesco Volpe, Paolo Pacitti (Author), Rugby 2000, GTE Gruppo Editorale (1999).

References

1998
1998 rugby union tournaments for national teams
rugby union
International rugby union competitions hosted by Singapore
1998 in Asian rugby union